Spalding is an unincorporated community in Macon County, in the U.S. state of Georgia.

History
A post office called Spalding was established 1895, and remained in operation until 1904.

The Georgia General Assembly incorporated Spalding as a town in 1869. The town's municipal charter was repealed in 1958.

References

Former municipalities in Georgia (U.S. state)
Unincorporated communities in Georgia (U.S. state)
Unincorporated communities in Macon County, Georgia